Kavinder Singh Bisht (born 1 February 1995) is an Indian boxer who competes in the featherweight category. 

Bisht won the silver medal in the men's bantamweight category at the 2019 Asian Amateur Boxing Championships, having beaten reigning world champion Kairat Yeraliyev in the quarterfinal.

At the AIBA World Boxing Championships, Bisht was a quarterfinalist in the flyweight category in 2017 and quarterfinalist in the featherweight category in 2019.

References

1995 births
Living people
Indian male boxers
Featherweight boxers
People from Pithoragarh district
Boxers from Uttarakhand